The Sony Ericsson P800 is a smartphone introduced in 2002 based upon UIQ version 2.0 (which itself is based upon Symbian OS v7.0) from Sony Ericsson. The P800 is considered the successor of the Ericsson R380, and initial design work was done within Ericsson, but it was produced after Sony & Ericsson merged their mobile phone businesses.

The P800 uses the UIQ (version 2.0) user interface and has a touch screen much like a PDA. It is powered by an ARM9 processor running at 156MHz, which was also used for the successive models Sony Ericsson P900, Sony Ericsson P910. It came with a 16MB Memory Stick Duo but supports up to 128MB. The touchscreen displays 4,096 colours (12-bit colour depth). It was succeeded in 2003 by the Sony Ericsson P900.

A long awaited updated version of the "P" series phones, the Sony Ericsson P990 was launched at the Symbian Smartphone Show in September 2005. It is based upon the UIQ3 platform (utilizing Symbian OS v9.1).

The latest successor is the Sony Ericsson P1, announced on 8 May 2007. Whilst using the same UIQ platform as the P990, it has a smaller form factor based on the Sony Ericsson M600 and updated hardware.

References

External links
 UIQ Technology
 UIQ Developer Portal

Sony Ericsson smartphones
Mobile phones introduced in 2002
Symbian devices
Mobile phones with infrared transmitter